Big Bear Lake is a small city in San Bernardino County, California, located in the San Bernardino Mountains along the south shore of Big Bear Lake, and surrounded by the San Bernardino National Forest. The city is located about 25 miles (40 km) northeast of the city of San Bernardino, and immediately west of the unincorporated town of Big Bear City. The population was approximately 5,019 at the 2010 census, down from 5,438 at the 2000 census. However, since it is a popular year-round resort destination, the actual number of people staying in or visiting the greater Big Bear Valley area regularly surges to over 100,000 during many weekends of the year.

History
Big Bear Lake was inhabited by the indigenous Serrano people for over 2,000 years before it was explored by Benjamin Wilson and his party. Once populated by only the natives and the grizzly bears, from which the area received its name, the population of the Big Bear Valley grew rapidly during the southern California gold rush from 1861 to 1912. Grizzly bears were not found in the region after 1908. Today, there are black bears in the region since their introduction in 1933, and they are sometimes sighted in residential areas.

A trip to Big Bear Lake from San Bernardino took two days on horse-drawn coaches. Kirk Phillips was a local who took a trip to New York City and saw the world's first bus line. This inspired him to create the world's second bus line from San Bernardino to Big Bear Valley using white trucks with several rows of seats. This made it possible for the villages to grow and for Big Bear Lake to become the first mountain recreation area in Southern California.

Many people traveled to enjoy recreation on the lake. However, another major draw was the natural hot spring. Emile Jesserun bought  of land that included the hot spring and built the first major resort in Big Bear, the Pan Hot Springs Hotel, in 1921. This resort was followed with others that strove to be the best by creating a country club atmosphere, complete with the amenities required to lure the Hollywood celebrities of the time including Cecil B. DeMille, Shirley Temple, and Ginger Rogers. By 1924, Big Bear was populated with 44 resorts and a constant stream of vacationers. The Pan Hot Springs Hotel, like many of the other resorts and hotels in Big Bear, was extensively damaged by fire in 1933.

For Hollywood's film industry, the area has been a popular place for shooting on location since the silent era. In late November 1915, Universal Studios filmed there for its three-reel production of John o' the Mountains starring Sydney Ayres and Louella Maxam. The 1920 version of Last of the Mohicans was filmed there as well, as were some scenes for the 1936 film Daniel Boone, Gone with the Wind, 20th Century Fox's 1960 film North to Alaska, Disney's Old Yeller, the 1969 musical film Paint Your Wagon, the 1983 movie War Games, and the 1985 "dark comedy" Better Off Dead. Many television series have filmed sequences there too, including opening sequences in 1969 for the NBC children's program H.R. Pufnstuf.

Winter activities are also popular in Big Bear. The first ski jump in Big Bear was erected in 1929 and quickly claimed a world ski jump record. More jumps were built in Big Bear Lake and the Viking Ski Club of Los Angeles began to use them for competition and events. The move to a winter resort town was solidified in 1952 when Tommy Tyndall opened a resort in Big Bear Lake, now known as Snow Summit. In some winters the area gets little snow, but snow machines keep the resorts in business.

In the summer of 1968, Caltech began construction of Big Bear Solar Observatory (BBSO) located on the north shore of Big Bear Lake. Due to extensive rain and snow, the lake rose several feet and BBSO was surrounded by water at the time construction was completed using makeshift barges in May 1970. BBSO, now operated by the New Jersey Institute of Technology, is still a major Big Bear Lake landmark connected to the north shore by a dirt and rock causeway.

Since 1970, Big Bear Lake has held an annual Oktoberfest. The Big Bear Lake Oktoberfest sports the highest beer garden, by elevation, in the United States. Big Bear Lake was incorporated as a city on November 28, 1980.

During the 1990s, the city became famous as a training spot for boxing champions. Oscar De La Hoya, Mike Tyson, Fernando Vargas, Gennady Golovkin, and Shane Mosley are among the famous boxers who have trained at Big Bear.

In February 2013, a major manhunt occurred in the Big Bear Lake area to find Christopher Dorner, who by that point had killed three people. A standoff ended in nearby Angelus Oaks.

Geography

Big Bear Lake is officially at an elevation of 6,752 ft (2,058 m) above sea level.

The California Office of Environmental Health Hazard Assessment has issued a safety advisory for any fish caught in Big Bear Lake due to elevated levels of mercury and PCBs.

Climate

Freezing temperatures have occurred in every month and occur on an average of 176.2 days each year, on average from September 24 to June 4.

Due to the  elevation of the weather station, precipitation is greater than in the lowlands of southern California, averaging  a year. Measurable precipitation normally occurs 43.3 days a year. Mountain thunderstorms can produce heavy rainfall, even in midsummer (when most southern California lowland locations are quite dry). Big Bear Lake's climate is Csb (Warm-summer Mediterranean) under the Köppen climate classification, bordering a humid continental climate (Dsb); it lies within USDA plant hardiness zone 7a. Big Bear Lake is the highest and coldest incorporated city in southern California.

In contrast to most of southern California, the Big Bear Lake region normally receives significant winter snow because of its high elevation. In February 1990,  of snow were recorded. Snow has fallen in every month except July and August.

Demographics

2010
The 2010 United States Census reported that Big Bear Lake had a population of 5,019. The racial makeup of Big Bear Lake was 4,204 (83.8%) White, (73.3% Non-Hispanic White), 22 (0.4%) African American, 48 (1.0%) Native American, 78 (1.6%) Asian, 10 (0.2%) Pacific Islander, 491 (9.8%) from other races, and 166 (3.3%) from two or more races. Hispanic or Latino of any race were 1,076 persons (21.4%).

The Census reported that 4,993 people (99.5% of the population) lived in households, 5 (0.1%) lived in non-institutionalized group quarters, and 21 (0.4%) were institutionalized.

There were 2,187 households, out of which 563 (25.7%) had children under the age of 18 living in them; 1,007 (46.0%) were opposite-sex married couples living together; 195 (8.9%) had a female householder with no husband present; 119 (5.4%) had a male householder with no wife present. There were 159 (7.3%) unmarried opposite-sex partnerships, and 24 (1.1%) same-sex married couples or partnerships. 675 households (30.9%) were made up of individuals, and 298 (13.6%) had someone living alone who was 65 years of age or older. The average household size was 2.28. There were 1,321 families (60.4% of all households); the average family size was 2.83.

There were 993 residents (19.8%) under the age of 18, 417 people (8.3%) aged 18 to 24, 1,021 people (20.3%) aged 25 to 44, 1,563 people (31.1%) aged 45 to 64, and 1,025 people (20.4%) who were 65 years of age or older. The median age was 46.1 years. For every 100 females, there were 104.7 males. For every 100 females age 18 and over, there were 103.8 males.

The homeowner vacancy rate was 14.0%; the rental vacancy rate was 45.2%. 2,708 people (54.0% of the population) lived in owner-occupied housing units and 2,285 people (45.5%) lived in rental housing units.

According to the 2010 United States Census, Big Bear Lake had a median household income of $32,869, with 16.9% of the population living below the federal poverty line.

2000
As of the census of 2000, there were 5,438 people, 2,343 households, and 1,494 families residing in the city. The population density was 860.1 inhabitants per square mile (332.2/km2). The racial makeup of the city was 91.2% White, 0.7% African American, 1.0% Native American, 0.8% Asian, <0.1% Pacific Islander, 3.6% from other races, and 2.8% from two or more races. Hispanic or Latino people of any race were 13.7% of the population.

There were 2,343 households, out of which 25.3% had children under the age of 18 living with them, 51.3% were married couples living together, 8.5% had a female householder with no husband present, and 36.2% were non-families. 29.4% of all households were made up of individuals, and 10.8% had someone living alone who was 65 years of age or older. The average household size was 2.3 and the average family size was 2.8.

In the city, 22.6% of residents were under the age of 18, 6.4% from 18 to 24, 24.5% from 25 to 44, 29.1% from 45 to 64, and 17.4% were 65 years of age or older. The median age was 43 years. For every 100 females, there were 107.1 males. For every 100 females age 18 and over, there were 103.0 males.

The median income for a household in the city was $100,447, and the median income for a family was $122,848. Males had a median income of $36,316 versus $21,404 for females. The per capita income for the city was $21,517. About 11.1% of families and 13.5% of the population were below the poverty line, including 17.9% of those under age 18 and 5.7% of those age 65 or over.

Attractions and activities

Big Bear Lake is Southern California's largest recreation lake. It is about seven miles long and about one mile at its widest. The primary summer attraction in Big Bear has been fishing, and it remains one of the most common activities there. The most abundant types of fish are trout, bass and catfish. Hiking, mountain biking and horse riding are also very popular. San Bernardino National Forest offers many trails in varying degrees of difficulty. During winter season Big Bear Lake becomes a skiing and snowboarding destination for Southern California. There are two ski resorts: Snow Summit and Bear Mountain.  The first Winter X Games were held in Big Bear Lake in 1997. The town was also home to the Big Bear Lake International Film Festival from 2000 to 2014.

Library
The community is served by the Big Bear Lake Branch of the San Bernardino County Library. The 8500 square-foot library is located on Garstin Drive near the southern shore of Big Bear Lake and offers books, videos, CDs, DVDs, audio books, e-books, computers, and internet access for patrons. The library was remodeled in 2009, which included additional public computers and a new circulation desk that allows for self check-out. Story times for younger children, teen programs, donated book sales, and special events are also held at the library.

Government
Big Bear Lake is a charter city under the laws of the state of California. It operates under the council/manager form of government. The city manager is Frank Rush. The city council includes five members elected at-large. The mayor is selected annually from among the city council members. The current mayor is Rick Herrick.

In the state legislature, Big Bear Lake is in the 23rd Senate District, represented by Republican Senator Rosilicie Ochoa Bogh, and in the 33rd Assembly District, represented by Republican Assembly Member Thurston "Smitty" Smith.

Transportation
Big Bear City Airport, a general aviation airport in the Big Bear City section of unincorporated San Bernardino County, serves Big Bear Lake.

Local bus service is provided by Mountain Transit, formerly known as Mountain Area Regional Transit Authority (MARTA). Mountain Transit provides services on a fixed route in the Big Bear Valley and from downtown San Bernardino to Big Bear Lake.

The Big Bear Valley is accessible by four California state highways: SR 18 from Highland, SR 330 from San Bernardino, SR 38 from Redlands, and SR 18 from Victorville.

Notable people
 Ryan Hall (born 1983 in Big Bear Lake), long-distance runner who won the marathon at the 2008 United States Olympic Trials and placed 10th in the Olympic marathon in Beijing; holds the U.S. record in the half marathon with a time of 0:59:43, becoming the first U.S. runner to break the one-hour barrier in the event
 Taran Killam (born 1982), actor and comedian best known for his television work on shows such as The Amanda Show, Scrubs, Wild 'N Out, MADtv, Stuck in the Suburbs; previously a cast member on Saturday Night Live
 Ed Masuga (born 1978), singer/songwriter based in the San Francisco Bay Area
 Jay Obernolte, current representative for California's 23rd Congressional District
 Heather O'Rourke, of Poltergeist (1982) fame; lived at Big Bear Lake in the mid-1980s
 Max Rafferty, former California Superintendent of Public Instruction and Republican U.S. Senate nominee in 1968; school administrator at Big Bear Lake High School in the late 1940s
 Jordan Romero, climber of the Seven Summits at the age of 15, breaking the past record set by George Atkinson

Sister cities 
  Abtenau, Austria

See also 
 1992 Big Bear earthquake
 Big Bear Discovery Center

References

Further reading

External links

 City of Big Bear Lake

Big Bear Valley
Cities in San Bernardino County, California
Incorporated cities and towns in California
San Bernardino Mountains